Ion-attachment mass spectrometry (IAMS) is a form of mass spectrometry that uses a "soft" form of ionization similar to chemical ionization in which a cation is attached to the analyte molecule in a reactive collision:
{M} + {X+} + A -> {MX+} + A

Where M is the analyte molecule, X+ is the cation and A is a non-reacting collision partner.

Principle
This technique is applicable to gases or any materials that can be vaporized. It uses a non-fragmenting non-conventional ionisation mode, by attachment of a lithium (or alkaline) ion to the gas to be analysed with a more traditional mass filter. This instrument is more dedicated to analysis of moderately-sized molecules such as organic or aromatic compounds.

Applications
Currently, it is used industrially to verify, with a high throughput, the concentrations of brominated flame retardants (BFR) in plastics in compliance with European RoHS (Restriction of Hazardous Substances) regulation in place since 2006. The banned molecules include PBB and PBDE, whose concentration should not exceed 0.1% w/w.

IAMS has also been used to analyze diesel exhaust particles, in ceramic processing  and in critical silicon etching during semiconductor manufacturing.

References

Bibliography

External links

Mass spectrometry